West Germany competed at the 1984 Summer Paralympics in Stoke Mandeville, Great Britain and New York City, United States. 142 competitors from West Germany won 232 medals including 81 gold, 76 silver and 75 bronze and finished 5th in the medal table.

See also 
 West Germany at the Paralympics
 West Germany at the 1984 Summer Olympics

References 

West Germany at the Paralympics
1984 in West German sport
Nations at the 1984 Summer Paralympics